Doldán is a surname. Notable people with the surname include:
José Doldán (born 1997), Paraguayan footballer
Luis Doldán (1938–2015), Paraguayan footballer
Roberto Fabian Sanchez Doldan (born 1988), Paraguayan footballer